Noviodunum is a name of Celtic origin, meaning "new fort": It comes from nowyo, Celtic for "new", and dun, the Celtic for "hillfort" or "fortified settlement", cognate of English town.

Several places were named Noviodunum. Among these:

 Jublains, Mayenne, France, capital of the Aulerci Diablintes
 Neung-sur-Beuvron, Loir-et-Cher, as Noviodunum Biturigum; the capital of the Bituriges, where Vercingetorix fought Julius Caesar in 52 BC.
 Nevers, Nièvre, France
 Pommiers, Aisne, France (oppidum of the Suessiones, situated on the nearby heights of Soissons)
 Nyon, Vaud, Switzerland (formed the city centre of Julius Caesar's 45 BC foundation of Colonia Iulia Equestris)
 Castra Noviodunum, a large Roman fortress and naval base near what is now Isaccea, Romania

Roman towns types
Roman towns and cities in France
Roman towns and cities in Romania